Jim Lynch (25 October 1883 – 15 June 1919) was an Australian rules footballer who played with Fitzroy and South Melbourne in the Victorian Football League (VFL).

Family
He married Jessie McWilliam in 1914.

Football

Fitzroy (VFL)
Recruited by Fitzroy from the Collingwood Trades Football Club in 1909, as a wing and rover — he had been the captain of Collingwood Trades in 1908.

South Melbourne (VFL)
He was cleared from Fitzroy to South Melbourne on 4 May 1910.

Death
He died of "pneumonic influenza" at Stockton, New South Wales on 15 June 1919.

Notes

References

 The Fitzroy Team (photograph), The Weekly Times, (Saturday, 15 May 1909), p.26.

External links 
		

1883 births
1919 deaths
Australian rules footballers from Victoria (Australia)
Fitzroy Football Club players
Sydney Swans players
Deaths from Spanish flu